Sakon Nakhon SAT Stadium is a multi-purpose stadium in Sakon Nakhon Province, Thailand.  It is currently used mostly for football matches.

Multi-purpose stadiums in Thailand
Buildings and structures in Sakon Nakhon province
Sport in Sakon Nakhon province